Kenneth Gasana (born Kenneth Wilson; November 9, 1984) is a Rwandan professional basketball player who currently plays for Bangui Sporting Club of the Road to BAL. Born in the United States, he represents Rwanda internationally.

Career
Gasana played his final two years of college basketball for Boise State.

Gasana started his professional career in 2007. In 2010, Gasana joined Moroccan club Chabab Rif Al Hoceima for one season which was followed by another season at Spaza Sports BC. In the 2014–15 season, he played in Egypt with Gezira.

His third team in Morocco was Ittihad Tanger, which he joined in 2018.

In 2019, Gasana signed with Rwanda-based REG BBC to play in the Rwandan National Basketball League. In October 2019, he joined the defending champions Patriots BBC. He went on to win the championship in 2019 and 2020 with Patriots. He also played with the team in the 2021 BAL season, where he led his team in scoring with 14.3 points per game. The Patriots finished in the fourth place of the tournament.

In November 2021, Gasana joined Burundian team New Star on a temporary contract, to join them in the 2022 BAL qualifiers. New Star failed to qualify, as the team was disqualified after players tested positive for COVID-19.

On January 5, 2022, Gasana signed with Bahrain Club of the Bahraini Premier League.

In May 2022, Gasana joined REG for a second stint ahead of the team's campaign in the 2022 BAL Playoffs. They were eliminated after just one game, losing to FAP. After the BAL, Gasana returned to Patriots BBC.

In November 2022, Gasana played for Bangui Sporting Club in the Road to BAL.

National team career
Although he was born in San Antonio, Texas, Gasana plays for the Rwandan national team and has been one of its top scorers through various editions of AfroBasket. He played with Rwanda at the AfroBasket five times: in 2009, 2011, 2013, 2017 and 2021.

BAL career statistics

|-
|style="text-align:left;"|2021
|style="text-align:left;"|Patriots
| 6 || 6 || 30.9 || .424 || .412 || .941 || 4.2 || 3.7 || 1.3 || .3 || 14.3
|-
|style="text-align:left;"|2022
|style="text-align:left;"|REG
| 1 || 0 || 24.0 || .167 || .200 || 1.000 || 5.0 || 2.0 || 3.0 || – || 7.0

Personal
Gasana holds a bachelor's degree in Communications from Boise State University.

References

External links
Eurobasket.com profile

1984 births
Living people
ABA All-Star Game players
American expatriate basketball people in Rwanda
Basketball players from San Antonio
Boise State Broncos men's basketball players
Junior college men's basketball players in the United States
New Star BBC players
People from Kigali
Rwandan men's basketball players
Rwandan people of American descent
Shooting guards
REG BBC players
Patriots BBC players
Gezira basketball players
Bangui Sporting Club players